Barcza is a surname. Notable people with the surname include:

 Attila Barcza (born 1985). Hungarian politician
Elemér von Barcza (1904 – 1987), Hungarian equestrian
 Gedeon Barcza (1911-1986), Hungarian chess grandmaster
Miklós Barcza (1908 – 1948), Hungarian ice hockey player
 Peter Barcza (born 1949), Canadian operatic baritone
 Arthus Barcza, undercover alias of Anatoly Gurevich, Soviet World War II spy in Germany

See also